Abū ʿAbd al-Raḥmān ʿAbd Allāh ibn ʿUbayd Allāh ibn al-Walīd al-Muʿayṭī, also spelled al-Muʿiṭī (died AD 1041 [AH 432]), was an Umayyad Caliph reigning in Dénia from 1014 until 1016 in opposition to Sulaymān ibn al-Mustaʿīn, reigning from Córdoba. He was a member of the Marwanid lineage and the only Andalusian Umayyad caliph not descended from ʿAbd al-Raḥmān III. He was a puppet of his ḥājib (chamberlain) Mujāhid al-ʿĀmirī, who was the actual ruler of the kingdom of Dénia. His authority did not extended beyond Dénia and the Balearic Islands.

Al-Muʿayṭī's name consists of the kunya, Abū ʿAbd al-Raḥmān (meaning "father of ʿAbd al-Raḥmān"); his actual given name, ʿAbd Allāh; and a series of patronymics indicating his descent from his father, ʿUbayd Allāh, as far back as an author wished to go. The historian Ibn Bashkuwāl recorded al-Muʿayṭī's genealogy back to Umayya ibn ʿAbd Shams, namesake of the dynasty. The name al-Muʿayṭī itself indicates that he belonged to the branch descended from Abī Muʿayṭ.

The seizure of Almería by Mujāhid's rival, Khayrān, in July 1014 provided the impetus for Mujāhid to legitimise his rule by proclaiming a caliph of his own. ʿAbd Allāh ibn ʿUbayd Allāh al-Muʿayṭī, as a descendant of Muḥammad and of the Qurayshī tribe, was a legitimate claimant. He was a faqīh (religious scholar), originally from Egypt, who had fled Córdoba and sought refuge in Dénia when Sulaymān, with an army of Berbers, had deposed the caliph Hishām II in 1013. He was proclaimed caliph in December 1014 with the honorific title al-Muntaṣir biʾllāh (Victor in God). Mujāhid then performed the bayʿa (oath of allegiance) and was appointed ḥājib.

The given names of al-Muʿayṭī and that of his son, ʿAbd al-Raḥmān, were put on the coins and flags of Dénia. Although the daʿwa (call) of al-Muʿayṭī was not widely heeded outside of the lands ruled by Mujāhid, it did receive the support of the great scholar Ibn Ḥazm when in 1016 al-Muʿayṭī was briefly the only Umayyad claimant. For this, the scholar was imprisoned by Khayrān, a support of the non-Umayyad caliph.

Within months of al-Muʿayṭī's appointment, Mujāhid set out on an expedition to conquer the island of Sardinia in the name of the new caliph. During his absence, an uprising led by ʿAlī ibn Ḥammūd deposed and executed Sulaymān. According to the historian Ibn ʿIdhāri, Sulaymān was distracted by the elevation of al-Muʿayṭī as his rival and did not foresee the uprising of ʿAlī, who soon had himself, although a non-Umayyad, proclaimed caliph.

Al-Muʿayṭī himself took advantage of Mujāhid's absence to assert his own authority. When the ḥājib returned from his second failed expedition to Sardinia in 1016, he deposed al-Muʿayṭī and exiled him to Africa. There he "eked out his remaining days as a wandering teacher, no doubt enthralling his pupils with tall stories of how he had once been the successor of the Prophet". He died in 1041, either at Kutāma in Morocco or at Baghdad.

With al-Muʿayṭī removed, Mujāhid recognised Sulaymān ibn al-Mustaʿīn's successor in Córdoba, ʿAbd al-Raḥmān al-Murtaḍā, as caliph in 1017 or 1018. It has even been suggested that al-Muʿayṭī's deposition was precipitated by the need for a united front against the anti-Umayyad usurpers of the Ḥammūdid dynasty after 1016.

References

1041 deaths
Umayyad caliphs